The Speaker Pro Tempore is an officer and second-highest ranking member of the Senate of Canada. The Speaker Pro Tempore ("acting Speaker") is a member of the Senate who is first nominated by a selection committee. The nomination is then confirmed through a vote in the Senate. The Speaker Pro Tempore serves whenever the Speaker of the Senate of Canada, who is appointed by the government, is unable to attend a sitting of the Senate.

The current of Speaker Pro Tempore is Pierrette Ringuette, who is serving in the position from May 1, 2020.

See also

 President pro tempore of the United States Senate
 President of the Senate (Australia)

External links
Officers and members of the Senate (official site)
List of Speakers Pro Tempore (official site)